Sir Clive Malcolm Thompson (born 4 April 1943) is a British businessman who is Deputy Chairman of Strategic Equity Capital plc. He was Chairman of Rentokil Initial plc between 2002 and 2004, having been Chief Executive for 20 years to 2002. He is a former president of the CBI, member of the Committee on Corporate Governance and Deputy Chairman of the Financial Reporting Council. He is a former Chairman of European Home Retail plc and director of J Sainsbury plc, Wellcome plc, Seeboard plc, Caradon plc and BAT Industries plc.

He was educated at the University of Birmingham (BSc).

Following the collapse of Farepak, the UK Insolvency Service applied to the High Court for Thompson to be disqualified as a Director, but the case was later dropped.

References

External links
Monbiot.com - Deregulation Kills - 5/11/98
ticles.com/p/articles/mi_qn4158/is_20010903/ai_n14419662 The Independent - The Monday interview: Sir Clive Thompson - Rentokil's chief - 03/09/01
The Evening Standard - Veteran Clive Thompson is fired by struggling Rentokil - 19/05/04
The Daily Mirror - Sir Clive Quits The Rat Pack - 20/05/04
The Independent - Sir Clive Thompson's verdict: the shareholders deserve better - 27/08/04
The Daily Telegraph - Outrage grows over directors' role in Farepak failure - 29/10/06
The Daily Telegraph - Farepak's Thompson: 'HBOS hung us out to dry' - 12/11/06
Swindon Advertiser - Farepak head could be stripped of knighthood - 15/11/06
BBC News - Farepak boss takes luxury holiday - 17/11/06

1943 births
Living people
Alumni of the University of Birmingham
Businesspeople awarded knighthoods
Knights Bachelor
People educated at Clifton College